Serum Institute of India (SII) is an Indian biotechnology and biopharmaceuticals company, based in Pune. It is the world's largest manufacturer of vaccines. It was founded by Cyrus Poonawalla in 1966 and is a part of Cyrus Poonawalla Group.

Overview
The Serum Institute of India was founded in 1966 in the city of Pune, India. The company set out to produce immunobiologicals, which were imported into India at high prices. Among the first products the Serum Institute of India manufactured in large quantities were the tetanus antitoxin, snake antivenom, DPT vaccine, and MMR vaccine. The company's product lines was expanded to include different types of vaccines against bacterial or virus infections, combination vaccines, influenza vaccine, and meningococcal vaccine. Besides vaccine the company also manufactures antisera, blood plasma, and hormone products. As of 2014 the vaccines manufactured by the Serum Institute of India have been used in international vaccination programmes run by the World Health Organization (WHO), UNICEF, and the Pan American Health Organization (PAHO). Today the Serum Institute of India is run by the Poonawalla Group and engages in research, development, and manufacturing.

In 2009 the company began developing an intranasal swine flu vaccine. In 2012, the company's first international acquisition was Bilthoven Biologicals, a biopharmaceutical company in Netherlands. In 2016, with support from US-based Mass Biologics of University of Massachusetts Medical School, the Serum Institute of India invented a fast-acting anti-rabies agent, Rabies Human Monoclonal Antibody (RMAb), also known as Rabishield.

, the company is the world's largest vaccine producer by number of doses produced, manufacturing around 1.5 billion doses of vaccines each year. The products developed include tuberculosis vaccine Tubervac (BCG), Poliovac for poliomyelitis, and other vaccinations for the childhood vaccination schedule.

COVID-19 vaccine development

The company has partnered with the British-Swedish multinational pharmaceutical company AstraZeneca, which is developing AZD1222 (Covishield) in partnership with the University of Oxford. It is reported that Serum Institute of India would provide 100 million (10 crore) doses of the vaccine for India and other low and middle-income countries. This target was later increased to 1 billion doses by the end of 2021. It is estimated to be priced at ₹225 (around $3) per dose. In September 2020, trials were halted by DCGI after a volunteer in Oxford developed illness following vaccination, but were soon resumed after consent by the British regulators. In December 2020, the Serum Institute of India  sought emergency approval for the vaccine developed with AstraZeneca  which was approved a month later. In March 2021, an agreement was reached to supply some doses to the UK.

Serum Institute of India has also reached an agreement with Novavax for the production of Novavax's NVX-CoV2373 (Covovax) vaccine for India and other low and middle-income countries. The company will also produce Codagenix's nasally administered COVID-19 vaccine CDX-005 (tradename COVI-VAC).

The company is also manufacturing Sputnik V vaccine in India in collaboration with Gamaleya Research Institute of Epidemiology and Microbiology after receiving approval from DCGI. On 13 July 2021, RDIF published a press release saying SII is starting the production of Sputnik V doses in September 2021. They intend to produce over 300 million doses of the vaccine in India per year.

Attempted data theft 
In March 2021, Reuters reported that Chinese state-backed cyber-espionage group Red Apollo targeted the Serum Institute of India's intellectual property for exfiltration.

See also
 Bharat Biotech
 Zydus Lifesciences
 Cadila Pharmaceuticals
 Biotechnology in India

References

External links
 Official website

Biotechnology companies of India
Vaccine producers
Manufacturing companies based in Pune
Indian companies established in 1966
Biotechnology companies established in 1966
1966 establishments in Maharashtra
Biopharmaceutical companies
Immunology organizations
Pharmaceutical companies of India
COVID-19 vaccine producers